Bill Turner (6 December 1901 – 3 January 1967) was an Australian rules footballer who played with Fitzroy in the Victorian Football League (VFL).

Notes

External links 

1901 births
1967 deaths
Australian rules footballers from Victoria (Australia)
Fitzroy Football Club players